Potuga is a corregimiento in Parita District, Herrera Province, Panama with a population of 1,045 as of 2010. Its population as of 1990 was 1,101; its population as of 2000 was 1,039.

References

Corregimientos of Herrera Province